This page lists all described species of the spider family Clubionidae accepted by the World Spider Catalog :

A

Arabellata

Arabellata Baert, Versteirt & Jocqué, 2010
 A. nimispalpata Baert, Versteirt & Jocqué, 2010 (type) — New Guinea
 A. terebrata Baert, Versteirt & Jocqué, 2010 — New Guinea

C

Carteronius

Carteronius Simon, 1897
 C. argenticomus (Keyserling, 1877) — Madagascar
 C. fuscus Simon, 1896 — Mauritius
 C. helluo Simon, 1896 (type) — Sierra Leone
 C. vittiger Simon, 1896 — Madagascar

† Chiapasona

† Chiapasona Petrunkevitch, 1963
 † C. defuncta Petrunkevitch, 1963

Clubiona

Clubiona Latreille, 1804
 C. abbajensis Strand, 1906 — Ethiopia, Somalia, Central, East Africa
 C. a. kibonotensis Lessert, 1921 — East Africa
 C. abboti L. Koch, 1866 — USA, Canada
 C. a. abbotoides Chamberlin & Ivie, 1946 — USA
 C. aberrans Dankittipakul, 2012 — Thailand
 C. abnormis Dankittipakul, 2008 — Thailand, Laos
 C. acanthocnemis Simon, 1906 — India
 C. achilles Hogg, 1896 — Australia (Central)
 C. acies Nicolet, 1849 — Chile
 C. aciformis Zhang & Hu, 1991 — China
 C. aculeata Zhang, Zhu & Song, 2007 — China
 C. adjacens Gertsch & Davis, 1936 — USA
 C. aducta Simon, 1932 — Portugal, Spain, Italy
 C. africana Lessert, 1921 — East Africa
 C. akagiensis Hayashi, 1985 — Japan
 C. alexeevi Mikhailov, 1990 — Russia (Caucasus)
 C. aliceae Chickering, 1937 — Panama
 C. allotorta Dankittipakul & Singtripop, 2008 — Thailand
 C. alluaudi Simon, 1898 — Mauritius
 C. alpicola Kulczyński, 1882 — Europe to Central Asia
 C. alticola Dankittipakul & Singtripop, 2008 — Thailand
 C. altissimoides Liu, Yan, Griswold & Ubick, 2007 — China
 C. altissimus Hu, 2001 — China
 C. alveolata L. Koch, 1873 — Samoa, Funafuti, Marquesas Is., Hawaii
 C. amurensis Mikhailov, 1990 — Russia (Far East), Japan
 C. analis Thorell, 1895 — India, Bangladesh, Myanmar
 C. andreinii Caporiacco, 1936 — Italy
 C. angulata Dondale & Redner, 1976 — Canada
 C. annuligera Lessert, 1929 — Congo, Mozambique
 C. anwarae Biswas & Raychaudhuri, 1996 — Bangladesh
 C. apiata Urquhart, 1893 — Australia (Tasmania)
 C. apiculata Dankittipakul & Singtripop, 2014 — Malaysia (Borneo)
 C. applanata Liu, Yan, Griswold & Ubick, 2007 — China
 C. aspidiphora Simon, 1910 — South Africa
 C. asrevida Ono, 1992 — Taiwan
 C. auberginosa Zhang, Yin, Bao & Kim, 1997 — China
 C. australiaca Kolosváry, 1934 — Australia (New South Wales)
 C. bachmaensis Ono, 2009 — Vietnam
 C. bagerhatensis Biswas & Raychaudhuri, 1996 — Bangladesh
 C. baimaensis Song & Zhu, 1991 — China
 C. baishishan Zhang, Zhu & Song, 2003 — China
 C. bakurovi Mikhailov, 1990 — Russia (Far East), China, Korea
 C. bandoi Hayashi, 1995 — Japan
 C. basarukini Mikhailov, 1990 — Russia (South Siberia, Far East), Mongolia, Japan
 C. bashkirica Mikhailov, 1992 — Russia (Urals, West Siberia)
 C. batikanoides Barrion, Barrion-Dupo & Heong, 2013 — China (Hainan)
 C. bengalensis Biswas, 1984 — India
 C. bevisi Lessert, 1923 — South Africa
 C. biaculeata Simon, 1897 — South Africa
 C. bicornis Yu & Li, 2019 — China
 C. bicuspidata Wu & Zhang, 2014 — China
 C. biembolata Deeleman-Reinhold, 2001 — Malaysia (Borneo), Indonesia (Sumatra)
 C. bifissurata Kritscher, 1966 — New Caledonia
 C. biforamina Liu, Peng & Yan, 2016 — China
 C. bifurcata Zhang, Yu & Zhong, 2018 — China
 C. bilobata Dhali, Roy, Saha & Raychaudhuri, 2016 — India
 C. bipinnata Yu, Zhang & Chen, 2017 — China
 C. bishopi Edwards, 1958 — USA, Canada
 C. blesti Forster, 1979 — New Zealand
 C. bomiensis Zhang & Zhu, 2009 — China
 C. boxaensis Biswas & Biswas, 1992 — India
 C. brachyptera Zhu & Chen, 2012 — China (Hainan)
 C. brevipes Blackwall, 1841 — Europe, Caucasus, Japan?
 C. brevispina Huang & Chen, 2012 — Taiwan
 C. bryantae Gertsch, 1941 — USA, Canada
 C. bucera Yang, Ma & Zhang, 2011 — China
 C. bukaea (Barrion & Litsinger, 1995) — Philippines
 C. cada Forster, 1979 — New Zealand
 C. caerulescens L. Koch, 1867 — Europe, Russia (Europe to Far East), Kazakhstan, China, Japan
 C. californica Fox, 1938 — USA
 C. calycina Wu & Zhang, 2014 — China
 C. cambridgei L. Koch, 1873 — New Zealand
 C. campylacantha Dankittipakul, 2008 — Thailand
 C. canaca Berland, 1930 — New Caledonia
 C. canadensis Emerton, 1890 — USA, Canada
 C. canberrana Dondale, 1966 — Australia (New South Wales)
 C. candefacta Nicolet, 1849 — Chile
 C. caohai Zhang & Yu, 2020 — China
 C. capensis Simon, 1897 — South Africa
 C. catawba Gertsch, 1941 — USA
 C. caucasica Mikhailov & Otto, 2017 — Caucasus (Georgia, Armenia, Azerbaijan, Russia), Turkey
 C. chabarovi Mikhailov, 1991 — Russia (Far East)
 C. chakrabartei Majumder & Tikader, 1991 — India
 C. charitonovi Mikhailov, 1990 — Russia (South Siberia, Far East)
 C. charleneae Barrion & Litsinger, 1995 — Philippines
 C. chathamensis Simon, 1905 — New Zealand (Chatham Is.)
 C. cheni Yu & Li, 2019 — China
 C. chevalieri Berland, 1936 — Cape Verde Is.
 C. chikunii Hayashi, 1986 — Japan
 C. chippewa Gertsch, 1941 — USA, Canada
 C. circulata Zhang & Yin, 1998 — China
 C. cirrosa Ono, 1989 — Japan (Ryukyu Is.)
 C. citricolor Lawrence, 1952 — South Africa
 C. clima Forster, 1979 — New Zealand
 C. cochlearis Yu & Li, 2019 — China
 C. cochleata Wang, Wu & Zhang, 2015 — China
 C. complicata Banks, 1898 — Mexico
 C. comta C. L. Koch, 1839 — Europe, North Africa, Turkey, Caucasus
 C. concinna (Thorell, 1887) — Myanmar
 C. congentilis Kulczyński, 1913 — Central Europe to Central Asia
 C. conica Dankittipakul & Singtripop, 2014 — Malaysia (Borneo)
 C. consensa Forster, 1979 — New Zealand
 C. contaminata O. Pickard-Cambridge, 1872 — Israel
 C. contrita Forster, 1979 — New Zealand
 C. convoluta Forster, 1979 — New Zealand
 C. cordata Zhang & Zhu, 2009 — China
 C. coreana Paik, 1990 — Russia (Far East), China, Korea
 C. corrugata Bösenberg & Strand, 1906 — Russia (Far East), China, Taiwan, Korea, Japan, Thailand
 C. corticalis (Walckenaer, 1802) — Europe, Turkey, Caucasus
 C. c. concolor Kulczyński, 1897 — Hungary
 C. c. nigra Simon, 1878 — France
 C. cultrata Dankittipakul & Singtripop, 2014 — Indonesia (Borneo)
 C. cycladata Simon, 1909 — Australia (Western Australia)
 C. cylindrata Liu, Yan, Griswold & Ubick, 2007 — China
 C. cylindriformis Dankittipakul & Singtripop, 2014 — Malaysia (Borneo)
 C. dactylina Liu, Peng & Yan, 2016 — China
 C. dakong Zhang & Yu, 2020 — China
 C. damirkovaci Deeleman-Reinhold, 2001 — Malaysia
 C. debilis Nicolet, 1849 — Chile
 C. deletrix O. Pickard-Cambridge, 1885 — India, China, Taiwan, Japan
 C. delicata Forster, 1979 — New Zealand
 C. denticulata Dhali, Roy, Saha & Raychaudhuri, 2016 — India
 C. desecheonis Petrunkevitch, 1930 — Puerto Rico
 C. deterrima Strand, 1904 — Norway
 C. dichotoma Wang, Chen & Z. S. Zhang, 2018 — China
 C. didentata Zhang & Yin, 1998 — China
 C. digitata Dankittipakul, 2012 — Thailand
 C. dikita Barrion & Litsinger, 1995 — Philippines
 C. diversa O. Pickard-Cambridge, 1862 — Europe, Caucasus, Russia (Europe to Far East), Kazakhstan, Pakistan, Korea, Japan
 C. drassodes O. Pickard-Cambridge, 1874 — India, Bangladesh, China
 C. dubia O. Pickard-Cambridge, 1870 — St. Helena
 C. dunini Mikhailov, 2003 — Russia (Far East)
 C. duoconcava Zhang & Hu, 1991 — China
 C. durbana Roewer, 1951 — South Africa
 C. dyasia Gertsch, 1941 — USA
 C. dysderiformis (Guérin, 1838) — New Guinea
 C. elaphines Urquhart, 1893 — Australia (Tasmania)
 C. ericius Chrysanthus, 1967 — New Guinea
 C. eskovi Mikhailov, 1995 — Russia (Far East)
 C. estes Edwards, 1958 — USA
 C. esuriens Thorell, 1897 — Myanmar
 C. evoronensis Mikhailov, 1995 — Russia (Far East)
 C. excavata (Rainbow, 1920) — Australia (Lord Howe Is.)
 C. excisa O. Pickard-Cambridge, 1898 — Mexico
 C. ezoensis Hayashi, 1987 — Russia (Far East), Japan
 C. facilis O. Pickard-Cambridge, 1911 — Britain
 C. falcata Tang, Song & Zhu, 2005 — China, Mongolia
 C. falciforma Liu, Peng & Yan, 2016 — China
 C. fanjingshan Wang, Chen & Z. S. Zhang, 2018 — China
 C. femorocalcarata Huang & Chen, 2012 — Taiwan
 C. filicata O. Pickard-Cambridge, 1874 — Pakistan, India, Bangladesh, Myanmar, Thailand, Laos, China
 C. filifera Dankittipakul, 2008 — Thailand
 C. filoramula Zhang & Yin, 1998 — China
 C. flavocincta Nicolet, 1849 — Chile
 C. forcipa Yang, Song & Zhu, 2003 — China
 C. frisia Wunderlich & Schuett, 1995 — Europe to Central Asia
 C. frutetorum L. Koch, 1867 — Europe to Central Asia
 C. furcata Emerton, 1919 — North America, Russia (Middle to East Siberia)
 C. fusoidea Zhang, 1992 — China
 C. fuzhouensis Gong, 1985 — China
 C. gallagheri Barrion & Litsinger, 1995 — Indonesia (Java)
 C. germanica Thorell, 1871 — Europe, Caucasus, Russia (Europe to Far East), Central Asia
 C. gertschi Edwards, 1958 — USA
 C. gilva O. Pickard-Cambridge, 1872 — Israel
 C. giulianetti Rainbow, 1898 — New Guinea
 C. glatiosa Saito, 1934 — Japan
 C. globosa Wang, Chen & Z. S. Zhang, 2018 — China
 C. godfreyi Lessert, 1921 — East Africa
 C. golovatchi Mikhailov, 1990 — Russia (Europe), Caucasus
 C. gongi Zhang, Yin, Bao & Kim, 1997 — China
 C. gongshan He, Liu & Zhang, 2016 — China
 C. grucollaris Yu, Zhang & Chen, 2017 — China
 C. guianensis Caporiacco, 1947 — Guyana
 C. haeinsensis Paik, 1990 — Russia (Far East), China, Korea, Japan
 C. haplotarsa Simon, 1909 — São Tomé and Príncipe
 C. hatamensis (Thorell, 1881) — New Guinea
 C. haupti Tang, Song & Zhu, 2005 — China
 C. hedini Schenkel, 1936 — China
 C. helenae Mikhailov, 2003 — Russia (Far East)
 C. helva Simon, 1897 — South Africa
 C. heteroducta Zhang & Yin, 1998 — China
 C. heterosaca Yin, Yan, Gong & Kim, 1996 — China
 C. hexadentata Dhali, Roy, Saha & Raychaudhuri, 2016 — India
 C. hilaris Simon, 1878 — Mountains of Spain, France, Italy, Austria, Switzerland, North Macedonia and Romania
 C. hindu Deeleman-Reinhold, 2001 — Indonesia (Bali)
 C. hitchinsi Saaristo, 2002 — Seychelles, French Polynesia (Tuamotu)
 C. hoffmanni Schenkel, 1937 — Madagascar
 C. hooda Dong & Zhang, 2016 — China
 C. huaban Xin, Zhang, Li, Zheng & Yu, 2020 — China
 C. hugispaa Barrion & Litsinger, 1995 — Philippines
 C. hugisva Barrion & Litsinger, 1995 — Philippines
 C. huiming Wang, F. Zhang & Z. S. Zhang, 2018 — China
 C. hummeli Schenkel, 1936 — China
 C. hundeshageni Strand, 1907 — Indonesia (Moluccas)
 C. huttoni Forster, 1979 — New Zealand
 C. hwanghakensis Paik, 1990 — Korea
 C. hyrcanica Mikhailov, 1990 — Azerbaijan, Iran
 C. hysgina Simon, 1889 — India
 C. hystrix Berland, 1938 — Indonesia (Lesser Sunda Is.), Vanuatu
 C. iharai Ono, 1995 — Japan
 C. ikedai Ono, 1992 — Japan
 C. inaensis Hayashi, 1989 — Japan
 C. inquilina Deeleman-Reinhold, 2001 — Malaysia (Borneo)
 C. insulana Ono, 1989 — Taiwan, Japan (Ryukyu Is.)
 C. interjecta L. Koch, 1879 — Russia (West Siberia to Far East), Mongolia, China
 C. irinae Mikhailov, 1991 — Russia (Far East), China, Korea
 C. jaegeri Ono, 2011 — Palau Is.
 C. janae Edwards, 1958 — USA
 C. japonica L. Koch, 1878 — Russia (Sakhalin, Kurile Is.), China, Korea, Taiwan, Japan
 C. japonicola Bösenberg & Strand, 1906 — Russia (Far East) to Philippines, Indonesia
 C. jiandan Yu & Li, 2019 — China
 C. jiulongensis Zhang, Yin & Kim, 1996 — China
 C. johnsoni Gertsch, 1941 — USA, Canada
 C. jucunda (Karsch, 1879) — Russia (Far East), China, Korea, Taiwan, Japan
 C. juvenis Simon, 1878 — Europe, Iran, Uzbekistan
 C. kagani Gertsch, 1941 — USA
 C. kai Jäger & Dankittipakul, 2010 — China, Laos
 C. kaltenbachi Kritscher, 1966 — New Caledonia
 C. kapataganensis Barrion & Litsinger, 1995 — Philippines
 C. kasanensis Paik, 1990 — Korea, Japan
 C. kastoni Gertsch, 1941 — USA, Canada
 C. kasurensis Mukhtar & Mushtaq, 2005 — Pakistan
 C. katioryza Barrion & Litsinger, 1995 — Philippines
 C. kayashimai Ono, 1994 — Taiwan
 C. kiboschensis Lessert, 1921 — East Africa
 C. kigabensis Strand, 1915 — East Africa
 C. kimyongkii Paik, 1990 — Russia (Far East), China, Korea
 C. kiowa Gertsch, 1941 — North America
 C. komissarovi Mikhailov, 1992 — Russia (Far East), Korea
 C. kowong Chrysanthus, 1967 — New Guinea
 C. krisisensis Barrion & Litsinger, 1995 — Philippines, Indonesia (Borneo)
 C. kropfi Zhang, Zhu & Song, 2003 — China
 C. kuanshanensis Ono, 1994 — Taiwan
 C. kularensis Marusik & Koponen, 2002 — Russia (north-eastern Siberia, Far East)
 C. kulczynskii Lessert, 1905 — North America, Europe, Kazakhstan, Russia (Europe to Far East), Japan
 C. kumadaorum Ono, 1992 — Japan
 C. kunashirensis Mikhailov, 1990 — Russia (Sakhalin, Kurile Is.), Japan
 C. kurenshikovi Mikhailov, 1995 — Russia (Far East)
 C. kurilensis Bösenberg & Strand, 1906 — Russia (Far East), China, Taiwan, Korea, Japan
 C. kurosawai Ono, 1986 — Taiwan, Korea, Japan
 C. kuu Jäger & Dankittipakul, 2010 — Laos
 C. lala Jäger & Dankittipakul, 2010 — Laos
 C. lamellaris Zhang, Yu & Zhong, 2018 — China
 C. lamina Zhang, Zhu & Song, 2007 — China
 C. langei Mikhailov, 1991 — Russia (Far East)
 C. latericia Kulczyński, 1926 — Russia (Middle Siberia to Far East), USA (Alaska)
 C. laticeps O. Pickard-Cambridge, 1885 — China (Yarkand)
 C. latitans Pavesi, 1883 — Ethiopia, Somalia, Kenya
 C. laudabilis Simon, 1909 — Australia (Western Australia)
 C. lawrencei Roewer, 1951 — South Africa
 C. lena Bösenberg & Strand, 1906 — China, Korea, Japan
 C. leonilae Barrion & Litsinger, 1995 — Philippines
 C. leptosa Zhang, Yin, Bao & Kim, 1997 — China
 C. limpida Simon, 1897 — South Africa
 C. linea Xie, Yin, Yan & Kim, 1996 — China
 C. linzhiensis Hu, 2001 — China
 C. lirata Yang, Song & Zhu, 2003 — China
 C. littoralis Banks, 1895 — USA, Canada
 C. logunovi Mikhailov, 1990 — Russia (Far East)
 C. longipes Nicolet, 1849 — Chile
 C. luapalana Giltay, 1935 — Congo
 C. lucida He, Liu & Zhang, 2016 — China
 C. ludhianaensis Tikader, 1976 — India, Bangladesh
 C. lutescens Westring, 1851 — Europe, Turkey, Caucasus, Russia (Europe to Far East), Iran, Kazakhstan, Korea, Japan. Introduced to North America
 C. lyriformis Song & Zhu, 1991 — China
 C. maculata Roewer, 1951 — Australia (Queensland)
 C. mahensis Simon, 1893 — Seychelles
 C. maipai Jäger & Dankittipakul, 2010 — Thailand
 C. mandschurica Schenkel, 1953 — Russia (Far East), China, Korea, Japan
 C. manshanensis Zhu & An, 1988 — China
 C. maracandica Kroneberg, 1875 — Uzbekistan
 C. maritima L. Koch, 1867 — USA, Canada, Caribbean
 C. marmorata L. Koch, 1866 — France to Ukraine and Turkey
 C. marna Roddy, 1966 — USA
 C. marusiki Mikhailov, 1990 — Russia (Far East)
 C. maya Hayashi & Yoshida, 1991 — Japan
 C. maysangarta Barrion & Litsinger, 1995 — Philippines
 C. mayumiae Ono, 1993 — Russia (Far East), Korea, Japan
 C. mazandaranica Mikhailov, 2003 — Azerbaijan, Iran
 C. medog Zhang, Zhu & Song, 2007 — China
 C. melanosticta Thorell, 1890 — Thailand, Indonesia (Sumatra, Krakatau), New Guinea
 C. melanothele Thorell, 1895 — Myanmar, Thailand, Laos, Indonesia (Sumatra)
 C. meraukensis Chrysanthus, 1967 — Malaysia, New Guinea
 C. microsapporensis Mikhailov, 1990 — Russia (Far East), Korea
 C. mikhailovi Deeleman-Reinhold, 2001 — Indonesia (Java)
 C. milingae Barrion-Dupo, Barrion & Heong, 2013 — China (Hainan)
 C. mimula Chamberlin, 1928 — USA, Canada
 C. minima (Ono, 2010) — Japan
 C. minuscula Nicolet, 1849 — Chile
 C. minuta Nicolet, 1849 — Chile
 C. mixta Emerton, 1890 — USA, Canada
 C. modesta L. Koch, 1873 — Australia (Queensland)
 C. moesta Banks, 1896 — USA, Canada, China
 C. moralis Song & Zhu, 1991 — China, Taiwan
 C. mordica O. Pickard-Cambridge, 1898 — Mexico
 C. mujibari Biswas & Raychaudhuri, 1996 — Bangladesh
 C. multidentata Liu, Peng & Yan, 2016 — China
 C. munda Thorell, 1887 — Myanmar
 C. munis Simon, 1909 — Australia (Western Australia)
 C. mutata Gertsch, 1941 — USA, Canada
 C. mutilata Bösenberg & Strand, 1906 — Japan
 C. mykolai Mikhailov, 2003 — Ukraine
 C. nataliae Trilikauskas, 2007 — Russia (Far East)
 C. natalica Simon, 1897 — South Africa
 C. neglecta O. Pickard-Cambridge, 1862 — Europe, Turkey, Caucasus, Russia (Europe to South Siberia), Iran, Central Asia, China, Korea
 C. neglectoides Bösenberg & Strand, 1906 — China, Korea, Japan
 C. nemorum Ledoux, 2004 — Réunion
 C. nenilini Mikhailov, 1995 — Russia (South Siberia)
 C. neocaledonica Berland, 1924 — New Caledonia
 C. newnani Ivie & Barrows, 1935 — USA
 C. nicholsi Gertsch, 1941 — USA
 C. nicobarensis Tikader, 1977 — India (Nicobar Is.)
 C. nigromaculosa Blackwall, 1877 — Seychelles, Réunion
 C. nilgherina Simon, 1906 — India
 C. ningpoensis Schenkel, 1944 — China
 C. nollothensis Simon, 1910 — South Africa
 C. norvegica Strand, 1900 — North America, Europe, Russia (Europe to West Siberia)
 C. notabilis L. Koch, 1873 — Australia (Queensland)
 C. obesa Hentz, 1847 — USA, Canada
 C. oceanica Ono, 2011 — Japan
 C. octoginta Dankittipakul, 2008 — Thailand
 C. odelli Edwards, 1958 — USA
 C. odesanensis Paik, 1990 — Russia (Far East), China, Korea
 C. ogatai Ono, 1995 — Japan
 C. oligerae Mikhailov, 1995 — Russia (Far East)
 C. opeongo Edwards, 1958 — Canada
 C. orientalis Mikhailov, 1995 — North Korea
 C. oteroana Gertsch, 1941 — USA
 C. ovalis Zhang, 1991 — China
 C. pacifica Banks, 1896 — USA, Canada
 C. paenuliformis (Strand, 1916) — Ghana
 C. pahilistapyasea Barrion & Litsinger, 1995 — Thailand, Indonesia (Borneo), Philippines
 C. paiki Mikhailov, 1991 — Russia (Far East)
 C. pala Deeleman-Reinhold, 2001 — Indonesia (Moluccas)
 C. pallidula (Clerck, 1757) (type) — Europe, Caucasus, Russia (Europe to Far East), Central Asia. Introduced to North America
 C. pantherina Chrysanthus, 1967 — New Guinea
 C. papillata Schenkel, 1936 — Russia (Far East), China, Korea
 C. papuana Chrysanthus, 1967 — New Guinea
 C. paralena Mikhailov, 1995 — North Korea
 C. parallela Hu & Li, 1987 — China
 C. paranghinlalakirta Barrion & Litsinger, 1995 — Philippines
 C. parangunikarta Barrion & Litsinger, 1995 — Philippines
 C. parconcinna Deeleman-Reinhold, 2001 — Thailand, Indonesia (Borneo)
 C. parva Seo, 2018 — Korea
 C. parvula Saito, 1933 — Japan
 C. peculiaris L. Koch, 1873 — New Zealand
 C. phansa Strand, 1911 — Indonesia (Aru Is.)
 C. phragmitis C. L. Koch, 1843 — Morocco, Algeria, Europe, Caucasus, Russia (Europe to Far East), Iran, Central Asia, China, Korea
 C. phragmitoides Schenkel, 1963 — China
 C. pianmaensis Wang, Wu & Zhang, 2015 — China
 C. picturata Deeleman-Reinhold, 2001 — Indonesia (Bali)
 C. pikei Gertsch, 1941 — USA, Canada
 C. pila Dhali, Roy, Saha & Raychaudhuri, 2016 — India
 C. plumbi Gertsch, 1941 — USA
 C. pogonias Simon, 1906 — India
 C. pollicaris Wu, Zheng & Zhang, 2015 — China
 C. pomoa Gertsch, 1941 — USA
 C. pongolensis Lawrence, 1952 — South Africa
 C. pototanensis Barrion & Litsinger, 1995 — Philippines
 C. praematura Emerton, 1909 — North America, Russia (Far East)
 C. procera Chrysanthus, 1967 — New Guinea
 C. procteri Gertsch, 1941 — USA
 C. producta Forster, 1979 — New Zealand
 C. propinqua L. Koch, 1879 — Russia (Middle Siberia to Far East), North Korea, China
 C. proszynskii Mikhailov, 1995 — North Korea
 C. pruvotae Berland, 1930 — New Caledonia
 C. pseudocordata Dhali, Roy, Saha & Raychaudhuri, 2016 — India
 C. pseudogermanica Schenkel, 1936 — Russia (Far East), China, Korea, Japan
 C. pseudomaxillata Hogg, 1915 — New Guinea
 C. pseudoneglecta Wunderlich, 1994 — Morocco, Algeria, Europe, Caucasus, Iran
 C. pseudopteroneta Raven & Stumkat, 2002 — Australia (Queensland)
 C. pseudosaxatilis Mikhailov, 1992 — Russia (Central Asia, South Siberia), Kazakhstan
 C. pseudosimilis Mikhailov, 1990 — Algeria, Portugal, Greece (Crete), Caucasus
 C. pterogona Yang, Song & Zhu, 2003 — China
 C. puera Nicolet, 1849 — Chile
 C. pupillaris Lawrence, 1938 — South Africa
 C. pupula Thorell, 1897 — Myanmar
 C. pygmaea Banks, 1892 — USA, Canada
 C. pyrifera Schenkel, 1936 — China
 C. qianhuayuani Barrion, Barrion-Dupo & Heong, 2013 — China (Hainan)
 C. qini Tang, Song & Zhu, 2005 — China
 C. qiyunensis Xu, Yang & Song, 2003 — China
 C. quebecana Dondale & Redner, 1976 — USA, Canada
 C. rainbowi Roewer, 1951 — Australia (Lord Howe Is.)
 C. rama Dankittipakul & Singtripop, 2008 — India, Thailand, China
 C. ramoiensis (Thorell, 1881) — New Guinea
 C. rava Simon, 1886 — Senegal
 C. reclusa O. Pickard-Cambridge, 1863 — Europe, Turkey, Russia (Europe to South Siberia), Kazakhstan
 C. revillioidi Lessert, 1936 — South Africa, Mozambique
 C. rhododendri Barrows, 1945 — USA
 C. rileyi Gertsch, 1941 — USA
 C. riparia L. Koch, 1866 — Russia (Urals to Far East), Mongolia, China, Japan, North America
 C. risbeci Berland, 1930 — New Caledonia
 C. rivalis Pavesi, 1883 — Ethiopia
 C. robusta L. Koch, 1873 — Australia
 C. roeweri Caporiacco, 1940 — Ethiopia
 C. rosserae Locket, 1953 — Britain, France, Netherlands, Poland, Slovakia, Hungary, Romania
 C. rostrata Paik, 1985 — Russia (Far East), China, Korea, Japan
 C. rothschildi Berland, 1922 — Ethiopia
 C. rumpiana Lawrence, 1952 — South Africa
 C. rybini Mikhailov, 1992 — Kazakhstan, Kyrgyzstan
 C. ryukyuensis Ono, 1989 — Japan (Ryukyu Is.)
 C. saltitans Emerton, 1919 — USA, Canada
 C. saltuum Kulczyński, 1898 — Austria
 C. samoensis Berland, 1929 — Samoa, French Polynesia (Society Is., Austral Is.: Rapa)
 C. sapporensis Hayashi, 1986 — Russia (Far East), Korea, Japan
 C. saurica Mikhailov, 1992 — Kazakhstan
 C. savesi Berland, 1930 — New Caledonia
 C. saxatilis L. Koch, 1867 — France to Poland and south-eastern Europe
 C. scandens Deeleman-Reinhold, 2001 — Malaysia (Borneo)
 C. scatula Forster, 1979 — New Zealand
 C. scenica Nicolet, 1849 — Chile
 C. semicircularis Tang, Song & Zhu, 2005 — China
 C. sertungensis Hayashi, 1996 — Indonesia (Krakatau)
 C. shillongensis Majumder & Tikader, 1991 — India
 C. sichotanica Mikhailov, 2003 — Russia (Far East)
 C. sigillata Lawrence, 1952 — South Africa
 C. silvestris Deeleman-Reinhold, 2001 — Malaysia (Borneo)
 C. similis L. Koch, 1867 — Europe, Turkey, Caucasus
 C. sjostedti Lessert, 1921 — East Africa
 C. s. spinigera Lessert, 1921 — East Africa
 C. sopaikensis Paik, 1990 — Russia (Far East), Korea
 C. sparassella Strand, 1909 — South Africa
 C. spiralis Emerton, 1909 — USA, Canada
 C. stagnatilis Kulczyński, 1897 — Europe, Caucasus, Russia (Europe to South Siberia), Central Asia
 C. stiligera Deeleman-Reinhold, 2001 — Indonesia (Sumatra)
 C. straminea O. Pickard-Cambridge, 1872 — Israel
 C. subapplanata Wang, Chen & Z. S. Zhang, 2018 — China
 C. subasrevida Yu & Li, 2019 — China
 C. subborealis Mikhailov, 1992 — Russia (South Siberia, Far East), Mongolia
 C. subcylindrica Wang, Chen & Z. S. Zhang, 2018 — China
 C. subkuu Yu & Li, 2019 — China
 C. submaculata (Thorell, 1891) — India (Nicobar Is.)
 C. submoralis Wu, Zheng & Zhang, 2015 — China
 C. subnotabilis Strand, 1907 — Australia
 C. subparallela Zhang, Zhu & Song, 2007 — China
 C. subquebecana Yu & Li, 2019 — China
 C. subrama Yu & Li, 2019 — China
 C. subrostrata Zhang & Hu, 1991 — China
 C. subsultans Thorell, 1875 — Europe, Russia (Europe to South Siberia), Japan
 C. subtilis L. Koch, 1867 — Europe, Russia (Europe to Far East), Kyrgyzstan, Korea
 C. subtrivialis Strand, 1906 — Ethiopia, East Africa
 C. subyaginumai Yu & Li, 2019 — China
 C. subyangmingensis Gan & Wang, 2020 — China
 C. suthepica Dankittipakul, 2008 — Thailand
 C. tabupumensis Petrunkevitch, 1914 — Myanmar
 C. taiwanica Ono, 1994 — China, Taiwan
 C. tangi Liu, Peng & Yan, 2016 — China
 C. tanikawai Ono, 1989 — China, Taiwan, Japan (Ryukyu Is.)
 C. tateyamensis Hayashi, 1989 — Japan
 C. tenera (Thorell, 1890) — Indonesia (Sumatra, Java)
 C. tengchong Zhang, Zhu & Song, 2007 — China
 C. ternatensis (Thorell, 1881) — Indonesia (Moluccas)
 C. terrestris Westring, 1851 — Europe (without Russia), Turkey
 C. theoblicki Yu & Li, 2019 — China
 C. thorelli Roewer, 1951 — Indonesia (Sumatra)
 C. tiane Yu & Li, 2019 — China
 C. tiantongensis Zhang, Yin & Kim, 1996 — China
 C. tikaderi Majumder & Tikader, 1991 — India
 C. tongdaoensis Zhang, Yin, Bao & Kim, 1997 — China, Korea
 C. tongi Yu & Li, 2019 — China
 C. topakea Barrion & Litsinger, 1995 — Philippines
 C. torta Forster, 1979 — New Zealand
 C. tortuosa Zhang & Yin, 1998 — China
 C. transbaicalica Mikhailov, 1992 — Russia (South Siberia)
 C. tridentata Dhali, Roy, Saha & Raychaudhuri, 2016 — India
 C. trivialis C. L. Koch, 1843 — North America, Europe, Russia (Europe to Far East), China, Japan
 C. tsurusakii Hayashi, 1987 — Russia (Kurile Is.), Japan
 C. uenoi Ono, 1986 — Japan
 C. umbilensis Lessert, 1923 — South Africa
 C. unanoa Barrion & Litsinger, 1995 — Philippines
 C. unikarta Barrion & Litsinger, 1995 — Philippines
 C. upoluensis Marples, 1964 — Samoa
 C. vachoni Lawrence, 1952 — South Africa
 C. vacuna L. Koch, 1873 — New Guinea, Australia (Queensland)
 C. valens Simon, 1897 — South Africa
 C. venatoria Rainbow & Pulleine, 1920 — Australia (Lord Howe Is.)
 C. venusae Barrion & Litsinger, 1995 — Philippines
 C. venusta Paik, 1985 — China, Korea
 C. victoriaensis Barrion & Litsinger, 1995 — Philippines
 C. vigil Karsch, 1879 — Russia (Kurile Is.), Korea, Japan, China
 C. vigillella Strand, 1918 — Japan
 C. violaceovittata Schenkel, 1936 — China
 C. vukomi Jäger & Dankittipakul, 2010 — Thailand, Laos
 C. wolongica Zhu & An, 1999 — China
 C. wulingensis Yu & Chen, 2017 — China
 C. xinwenhui Barrion, Barrion-Dupo & Heong, 2013 — China (Hainan)
 C. yaginumai Hayashi, 1989 — Taiwan, Japan
 C. yangmingensis Hayashi & Yoshida, 1993 — Taiwan
 C. yanzhii Zhang & Yu, 2020 — China
 C. yaoi Yu & Li, 2019 — China
 C. yaroslavi Mikhailov, 2003 — Russia (Far East)
 C. yasudai Ono, 1991 — Japan
 C. yoshidai Hayashi, 1989 — Japan
 C. yueya Yu & Li, 2019 — China
 C. yurii Mikhailov, 2011 — Mongolia
 C. zacharovi Mikhailov, 1991 — Russia (Far East), Korea
 C. zandstrai Barrion & Litsinger, 1995 — Philippines
 C. zhanggureni Yu & Li, 2019 — China
 C. zhangmuensis Hu & Li, 1987 — China
 C. zhangyongjingi Li & Blick, 2019 — China
 C. zhengi Yu & Li, 2019 — China
 C. zhui Xu, Yang & Song, 2003 — China
 C. zilla Dönitz & Strand, 1906 — Japan
 C. zimmermanni Marples, 1964 — Samoa
 C. zyuzini Mikhailov, 1995 — Russia (Far East)
 † C. arcana Scudder, 1890 
 † C. attenuata Koch and Berendt, 1854 
 † C. curvispinosa Petrunkevitch, 1922 
 † C. eversa Scudder, 1890 
 † C. florissanti Petrunkevitch, 1922 
 † C. lanata Koch and Berendt, 1854 
 † C. microphthalma Koch and Berendt, 1854 
 † C. pubescens Koch and Berendt, 1854 
 † C. sericea Koch and Berendt, 1854 
 † C. tomentosa Koch and Berendt, 1854

Clubionina

Clubionina Berland, 1947
 C. pallida Berland, 1947 (type) — St. Paul Is.

D

† Desultor

† Desultor Petrunkevitch, 1942
 † D. depressus Petrunkevitch, 1942

E

Elaver

Elaver O. Pickard-Cambridge, 1898
 E. achuca (Roddy, 1966) — USA
 E. albicans (Franganillo, 1930) — Cuba, Jamaica
 E. arawakan Saturnino & Bonaldo, 2015 — Haiti
 E. balboae (Chickering, 1937) — Panama to Brazil, Cuba
 E. barroana (Chickering, 1937) — Panama
 E. beni Saturnino & Bonaldo, 2015 — Peru, Brazil, Bolivia
 E. brevipes (Keyserling, 1891) — Brazil, Argentina
 E. calcarata (Kraus, 1955) — Mexico, El Salvador, Costa Rica
 E. candelaria Saturnino & Bonaldo, 2015 — Mexico
 E. carlota (Bryant, 1940) — Cuba
 E. chisosa (Roddy, 1966) — USA
 E. crinophora (Franganillo, 1934) — Cuba
 E. crocota (O. Pickard-Cambridge, 1896) — Mexico
 E. darwichi Saturnino & Bonaldo, 2015 — Panama, Ecuador
 E. depuncta O. Pickard-Cambridge, 1898 — Mexico
 E. elaver (Bryant, 1940) — Cuba
 E. excepta (L. Koch, 1866) — USA, Canada, Caribbean
 E. grandivulva (Mello-Leitão, 1930) — Brazil, Bolivia
 E. helenae Saturnino & Bonaldo, 2015 — Mexico
 E. hortoni (Chickering, 1937) — Panama
 E. implicata (Gertsch, 1941) — Hispaniola
 E. juana (Bryant, 1940) — Cuba, Bahama Is.
 E. juruti Saturnino & Bonaldo, 2015 — Brazil
 E. kawitpaaia (Barrion & Litsinger, 1995) — Philippines
 E. kohlsi (Gertsch & Jellison, 1939) — USA
 E. linguata (F. O. Pickard-Cambridge, 1900) — Guatemala
 E. lizae Saturnino & Bonaldo, 2015 — Costa Rica
 E. lutescens (Schmidt, 1971) — Panama to Brazil
 E. madera (Roddy, 1966) — USA
 E. mirabilis (O. Pickard-Cambridge, 1896) — Mexico, Belize, Nicaragua
 E. mulaiki (Gertsch, 1935) — USA
 E. multinotata (Chickering, 1937) — Costa Rica, Panama, Colombia, Venezuela, Peru, Brazil
 E. orvillei (Chickering, 1937) — Panama
 E. placida O. Pickard-Cambridge, 1898 — Mexico
 E. portoricensis (Petrunkevitch, 1930) — Puerto Rico, Virgin Is.
 E. quadrata (Kraus, 1955) — El Salvador
 E. richardi (Gertsch, 1941) — Honduras
 E. sericea O. Pickard-Cambridge, 1898 — Mexico
 E. shinguito Saturnino & Bonaldo, 2015 — Colombia, Peru, Brazil
 E. sigillata (Petrunkevitch, 1925) — Panama, Colombia, Peru, Brazil
 E. simplex (O. Pickard-Cambridge, 1896) — Guatemala
 E. tenera (Franganillo, 1935) — Cuba
 E. tenuis (Franganillo, 1935) — Cuba
 E. texana (Gertsch, 1933) — USA, Mexico
 E. tigrina O. Pickard-Cambridge, 1898 (type) — Mexico, Costa Rica
 E. tourinhoae Saturnino & Bonaldo, 2015 — Colombia, Brazil
 E. tricuspis (F. O. Pickard-Cambridge, 1900) — Guatemala, Panama
 E. tristani (Banks, 1909) — Costa Rica
 E. tumivulva (Banks, 1909) — Costa Rica
 E. turongdaliriana (Barrion & Litsinger, 1995) — Philippines
 E. valvula (F. O. Pickard-Cambridge, 1900) — Panama
 E. vieirae Saturnino & Bonaldo, 2015 — Brazil, Peru
 E. wheeleri (Roewer, 1933) — USA, Mexico
 † E. nutua Wunderlich, 1988

† Eobumbatrix

† Eobumbatrix Petrunkevitch, 1922
 † E. latebrosa Scudder, 1890

† Eodoter

† Eodoter Petrunkevitch, 1958
 † E. eopala Wunderlich, 2004 
 † E. longimammillae Wunderlich, 2012 
 † E. magnificus Petrunkevitch, 1958 
 † E. scutatus Wunderlich, 2011 
 † E. tibialis Wunderlich, 2011

† Eostentatrix

† Eostentatrix Petrunkevitch, 1922
 † E. cockerelli Petrunkevitch, 1922 
 † E. ostentata Scudder, 1890

† Eoversatrix

† Eoversatrix Petrunkevitch, 1922
 † E. eversa Scudder, 1890

I

Invexillata

Invexillata Versteirt, Baert & Jocqué, 2010
 I. caerulea Versteirt, Baert & Jocqué, 2010 — New Guinea
 I. maculata Versteirt, Baert & Jocqué, 2010 (type) — New Guinea
 I. viridiflava Versteirt, Baert & Jocqué, 2010 — New Guinea

M

† Machilla

† Machilla Petrunkevitch, 1958
 † M. setosa Petrunkevitch, 1958

Malamatidia

Malamatidia Deeleman-Reinhold, 2001
 M. bohorokensis Deeleman-Reinhold, 2001 (type) — Indonesia (Sumatra, Borneo)
 M. christae Jäger & Dankittipakul, 2010 — Laos
 M. thorelli Deeleman-Reinhold, 2001 — Indonesia (Sulawesi)
 M. vethi Deeleman-Reinhold, 2001 — Malaysia, Indonesia (Borneo)
 M. zu Jäger & Dankittipakul, 2010 — Laos

† Massula

† Massula Petrunkevitch, 1942
 † M. klebsi Petrunkevitch, 1942

Matidia

Matidia Thorell, 1878
 M. bipartita Deeleman-Reinhold, 2001 — Indonesia (Moluccas)
 M. calcarata Thorell, 1878 — Indonesia (Ambon)
 M. chlora Chrysanthus, 1967 — New Guinea
 M. flagellifera Simon, 1897 — Sri Lanka
 M. incurvata Reimoser, 1934 — India
 M. mas Deeleman-Reinhold, 2001 — Thailand
 M. missai Versteirt, Baert & Jocqué, 2010 — New Guinea
 M. muju Chrysanthus, 1967 — New Guinea
 M. paranga (Barrion & Litsinger, 1995) — Philippines
 M. simia Deeleman-Reinhold, 2001 — Indonesia (Sulawesi)
 M. simplex Simon, 1897 — Sri Lanka
 M. spatulata Chen & Huang, 2006 — Taiwan
 M. strobbei Versteirt, 2010 — New Guinea
 M. trinotata Thorell, 1890 — Malaysia
 M. virens Thorell, 1878 (type) — Indonesia (Moluccas, Sulawesi)
 M. viridissima Strand, 1911 — Indonesia (Aru Is.)

N

Nusatidia

Nusatidia Deeleman-Reinhold, 2001
 N. aeria (Simon, 1897) — Borneo
 N. bimaculata (Simon, 1897) — Sri Lanka
 N. borneensis Deeleman-Reinhold, 2001 — Indonesia (Sumatra, Borneo)
 N. camouflata Deeleman-Reinhold, 2001 — Thailand
 N. javana (Simon, 1897) (type) — Indonesia (Java, Krakatau)
 N. luzonica (Simon, 1897) — Philippines
 N. manipisea (Barrion & Litsinger, 1995) — Philippines
 N. melanobursa Deeleman-Reinhold, 2001 — Indonesia (Sumatra)
 N. pandalira Barrion-Dupo, Barrion & Heong, 2013 — China
 N. rama Deeleman-Reinhold, 2001 — Indonesia (Sumatra)
 N. snazelli Deeleman-Reinhold, 2001 — Indonesia (Java, Sumatra)
 N. vietnamensis Logunov & Jäger, 2015 — Vietnam

P

Porrhoclubiona

Porrhoclubiona Lohmander, 1944
 P. bosmansi Marusik & Omelko, 2018 — Tajikistan
 P. decora (Blackwall, 1859) — Madeira, Azores
 P. diniensis (Simon, 1878) — Algeria, Morocco, Tunisia, Portugal, Spain, France, Italy
 P. genevensis (L. Koch, 1866) (type) — Europe, Turkey, Caucasus, Russia (Europe to South Siberia), Iran, Central Asia
 P. laudata (O. Pickard-Cambridge, 1885) — China
 P. leucaspis (Simon, 1932) — Europe, Algeria, Morocco, Tunisia
 P. minor (Wunderlich, 1987) — Canary Is.
 P. moradmandi Marusik & Omelko, 2018 — Iran
 P. pseudominor (Wunderlich, 1987) — Canary Is.
 P. pteronetoides (Deeleman-Reinhold, 2001) — Thailand
 P. vegeta (Simon, 1918) — Canary Is., North Africa, Southern Europe, Caucasus, Iran
 P. viridula (Ono, 1989) — China, Taiwan, Thailand, Japan (Ryukyu Is.), Indonesia (Lesser Sunda Is.)
 P. wunderlichi (Mikhailov, 1992) — Mongolia

Pristidia

Pristidia Deeleman-Reinhold, 2001
 P. cervicornuta Yu, Zhang & Chen, 2017 — China (Hainan)
 P. longistila Deeleman-Reinhold, 2001 — Malaysia (Borneo)
 P. prima Deeleman-Reinhold, 2001 (type) — Thailand, Malaysia (Peninsula), Indonesia (Sumatra, Java)
 P. ramosa Yu, Sun & Zhang, 2012 — China, Taiwan
 P. secunda Deeleman-Reinhold, 2001 — Indonesia (Sumatra)
 P. viridissima Deeleman-Reinhold, 2001 — Thailand, Malaysia, Indonesia (Sumatra, Borneo, Java)

† Prosocer

† Prosocer Petrunkevitch, 1963
 † P. mollis Petrunkevitch, 1963

Pteroneta

Pteroneta Deeleman-Reinhold, 2001
 P. baiteta Versteirt, Deeleman-Reinhold & Baert, 2008 — New Guinea
 P. brevichela Versteirt, Deeleman-Reinhold & Baert, 2008 — New Guinea
 P. longichela Versteirt, Deeleman-Reinhold & Baert, 2008 — New Guinea
 P. madangiensis Versteirt, Deeleman-Reinhold & Baert, 2008 — New Guinea
 P. saltans Deeleman-Reinhold, 2001 (type) — Malaysia, Indonesia (Sulawesi, Lesser Sunda Is.), Borneo
 P. spinosa Raven & Stumkat, 2002 — Australia (Queensland)
 P. tertia Deeleman-Reinhold, 2001 — Singapore, Indonesia (Borneo, Sulawesi)
 P. ultramarina (Ono, 1989) — Japan (Ryukyu Is.)

S

Scopalio

Scopalio Deeleman-Reinhold, 2001
 S. verrens Deeleman-Reinhold, 2001 (type) — Borneo

Simalio

Simalio Simon, 1897
 S. aurobindoi Patel & Reddy, 1991 — India
 S. biswasi Majumder & Tikader, 1991 — India
 S. castaneiceps Simon, 1906 — India
 S. lucorum Simon, 1906 — Sri Lanka
 S. percomis Simon, 1906 — India
 S. petilus Simon, 1897 (type) — Philippines
 S. phaeocephalus Simon, 1906 — Sri Lanka
 S. rubidus Simon, 1897 — Trinidad

T

Tixcocoba

Tixcocoba Gertsch, 1977
 T. maya Gertsch, 1977 (type) — Mexico

References

Clubionidae